William Irvin may refer to:
William W. Irvin (1779–1842), U.S. representative from Ohio
Willie Irvin (born 1930), American football player
SS William A. Irvin, a 1937 lake freighter which sailed as a bulk freighter on the Great Lakes
William A. Irvin (1873–1927), president of U.S. Steel

See also
William Irvin Swoope (1862–1930), Republican representative from Pennsylvania
William Irvin Troutman (1905–1971), Republican representative from Pennsylvania
William Irvine (disambiguation)
William Irwin (disambiguation)
William Irving (disambiguation)

Irvin, William